Teewinot Mountain is the sixth highest peak in the Teton Range, Grand Teton National Park, Wyoming. The name of the mountain is derived from the Shoshone Native American word meaning "many pinnacles". The peak is northeast of the Grand Teton, and the two are separated from one another by the Teton Glacier and Mount Owen. Several periods of glaciation have carved Teewinot Mountain and the other peaks of the range into their current shapes. Broken Falls is one of the tallest cascades in Grand Teton National Park and descends  down the eastern slopes of Teewinot Mountain.

Climbing
Teewinot Mountain is most easily ascended via the eastern face, which finishes with a somewhat exposed Class 4 scramble to the tiny summit.  An unmarked climbers' trail, known as the Apex Trail, leads most of the way up the mountain from the Lupine Meadows area.

See also

Geology of the Grand Teton area

References

Mountains of Grand Teton National Park
Mountains of Wyoming
Mountains of Teton County, Wyoming